This is a list of bizarre buildings, buildings which are considered odd, strange or weird.  These may be follies, novelties or white elephants.

List

See also
 Avant-garde architecture

References

External links
78 Strangest buildings of the world

Lists of buildings and structures
buildings